Westview High School is a public high school in Portland, Oregon, United States, in the Beaverton School District. It opened in 1994 and its first graduating class was in June 1996.

Demographics
The demographic breakdown of the 2,366 students enrolled in 2020-21 was:

 Native American - 0.5%
 Asian/Pacific Islander - 28.3%
 Black - 3.6%
 Hispanic - 20.4%
 White - 40.2%
 Two or more races - 7.0%

Academics

In 2014, the average SAT score among Westview students was 1708, compared to the Oregon state average of 1544.

Also in 2014, the average ACT score among 552 students at Westview was 22.4, compared to the 21.4 state average.

Of the Class of 2014, which consisted of 571 students, 65% attended a four-year college, while 15% attended a two-year college.

Extracurricular activities

Speech and debate (forensics) 

Westview has been awarded three state championships in the 6A classification tournaments (for schools larger than 1,521 students). The school earned successive state championships in 2006 and 2007, and most recently earned the 2012 Oregon School Activities Association state championship. Among Metro League conference schools participating, Westview is the only one other than Sunset High School to have earned a state championship in Speech & Debate. In 2020, a Westview student from the graduating class of 2020, Anwesha Mukherjee, took home a national championship for the Ronald Reagan Great Communicator Debate Series.

Academic competitions 

Westview is home to several competitive academic teams, namely Science Bowl and History Bowl. The former group has earned two straight regional championships in 2016 and 2017 in the Bonneville Power Administration Regional Science Bowl, the largest tournament of its kind in the nation. Westview's Science Bowl team has appeared at the national competition for National Science Bowl in four consecutive years, placing second in their division at the national competition in 2017.

Westview's History Bowl program has also placed on the national level on multiple occasions. The team has twice been the national champion of History Bowl, in 2014 and again in 2017. Along with its regional success, History Bowl has given Westview national acclaim.

Individual Westview students have also had success in science fairs with many students both qualifying to and winning awards at the International Science and Engineering Fair, Regeneron ISEF (formerly Intel ISEF). In 2022, Rishab Jain became the first Westview student and third Oregon student to ever win a top 3 award at Regeneron ISEF.

Sports

State championships
 Boys' soccer: 2011, 2017
 Baseball: 2011, 2018
 Cheerleading: 2005, 2007, 2008, 2009, 2011, 2012, 2017, 2018, 2019, 2020
 Girls' Basketball: 2000
 Girls’ Tennis: 2021
 Girls' Swimming: 2022

Notable alumni

 Kara Braxton – WNBA basketball player 
 Trevor Crowe – former MLB baseball player
 Erik Hurtado – MLS soccer player 
 Garrett Jackson – professional basketball player 
 Ian Karmel – stand-up comedian and writer
 Carson Kelly – MLB baseball player
 Dallin Leavitt - professional football player
 Landen Lucas - professional basketball player
 Jaime Nared – WNBA basketball player
 Whitney Ping - 2004 Olympian competing in Women’s Doubles Table Tennis
 Samori Toure - pro football player

References

Educational institutions established in 1994
High schools in Washington County, Oregon
Public high schools in Oregon
1994 establishments in Oregon
Beaverton School District